That's it may refer to:

 That's It!, a 1961 album by American jazz saxophonist Booker Ervin
 That's It!, a 2013 album by Preservation Hall Jazz Band 
 That's It!, debut studio album by Ricky Skaggs
 "That's It", song by the Cars as the B-side of the single "Let's Go"
 "That's It", song by Mr Bishi, produced by Lisa Pin-Up
 "That's It", song by Bebe Rexha from the album All Your Fault: Pt. 2
 "That's It", song by Gotthard from their self-titled debut album
 "That's It (I'm Crazy)", song by Sofi Tukker
 "¡That's It! (Ya Estuvo)", American title for the single "Ya Estuvo" by Kid Frost from the album Hispanic Causing Panic
 "That's It", a song by Future and Lil Uzi Vert in their 2020 album Pluto x Baby Pluto

See also
 This Is It (disambiguation)
 That's All (disambiguation)